Marina Lewycka (born 12 October 1946) is a British novelist of Ukrainian origin.

Early life
Lewycka was born in a refugee camp in Kiel after World War II. Her family subsequently moved to England; she now lives in Sheffield, South Yorkshire. She attended Gainsborough High School for Girls in Gainsborough, Lincolnshire, then Witney Grammar School in Witney, Oxfordshire. She graduated from Keele University in 1968 with a BA in English and Philosophy, and from the University of York with a BPhil in English Literature in 1969. She began, but did not complete, a PhD at King's College London.

Career
She was a lecturer in media studies at Sheffield Hallam University until her retirement in March 2012.

Works
Lewycka's debut novel A Short History of Tractors in Ukrainian won the 2005 Bollinger Everyman Wodehouse Prize for comic writing at the Hay literary festival, the 2005/6 Waverton Good Read Award, and the 2005 Saga Award for Wit; it was long-listed for the 2005 Man Booker Prize and short-listed for the 2005 Orange Prize for Fiction. The novel has been translated into 35 languages.

Her second novel Two Caravans was published in hardback in March 2007 by Fig Tree (an imprint of Penguin Books) for the United Kingdom market, and was short-listed for the 2008 Orwell Prize for political writing. In the United States and Canada it is published under the title Strawberry Fields.

Lewycka's third novel, We Are All Made of Glue, was released in July 2009, and her fourth novel, Various Pets Alive and Dead, came out in March 2012.[10] Her fifth novel, published in 2016, was The Lubetkin Legacy, named after Berthold Lubetkin, the Georgian-born modernist architect, who built popular housing with the slogan: "Nothing is too good for ordinary people". The Lubetkin Legacy was shortlisted for the Bollinger Woodhouse Everyman for Comic Fiction prize.

In 2009 Lewycka donated the short story "The Importance of Having Warm Feet" to Oxfam's Ox-Tales project, four collections of UK stories written by 38 authors. Her story was published in the 'Earth' collection. Later the same year, she donated a second short story, "Business Philosophy", to the Amnesty International anthology Freedom: Short Stories Celebrating the Universal Declaration of Human Rights.

In 2020, Lewycka released the novel The Good, the Bad and the Little Bit Stupid. A review of the book in The Spectator noted that its commentary on Brexit and organ trafficking "seem not so much disparate as random".

In addition to her fiction, Lewycka has written a number of books giving practical advice for carers of elderly people, published by the charity Age Concern.

References

External links
 with complete bibliography, list of awards and critical perspective
In depth biographical article at Derbyshire Life magazine website
"Better Late Than Never", Interview by Stephen Moss, The Guardian, 31 May 2007. Retrieved on 31 May 2007
Three Monkeys Interview
Debut Novelist Takes Comic Prize about her winning the Bollinger for A Short History of Tractors in Ukrainian
Review of A Short History of Tractors in Ukrainian, Guardian, 19 March 2005
Review of Two Caravans, TimesOnLine, 25 March 2007 
Interview in the Guardian, 15 July 2008
Marina Lewycka talks about We are all Made of Glue on The Interview Online

1946 births
Living people
Academics of Sheffield Hallam University
Alumni of Keele University
Alumni of King's College London
Alumni of the University of York
21st-century English novelists
English people of Ukrainian descent
People educated at Queen Elizabeth's High School
Writers from Sheffield
Ukrainian women writers
Ukrainian emigrants to the United Kingdom
21st-century English women writers